Edd Hillstad is a Norwegian competition rower. He received a silver medal in lightweight coxless four at the 1976 World Rowing Championships, with the team members Pål Børnick, Per Arvid Steen, Olaf Solberg and Hillstad. The championship was held in Villach, Austria.

Hillstad represented the club Stavanger RK.

References

Year of birth missing (living people)
Living people
Norwegian male rowers
World Rowing Championships medalists for Norway